Sibthorp or Sibthorpe is a surname.

People with the surname include:
 A. B. C. Sibthorpe (183?–1916), African historian
 Charles Sibthorp (1783–1855), widely caricatured British Ultra-Tory politician in the early 19th century
 Fletcher Sibthorp (born 1967), British artist
 Gervaise Waldo-Sibthorp (1815–1861), Conservative Member of Parliament (MP) for Lincoln 1856–1861
 Humphry Sibthorp (1713–1797), British botanist
 Humphrey Sibthorp (1744–1815), Tory Member of Parliament (MP) for Boston 1777–1784 and Lincoln 1800–1806
 John Sibthorp (1758–1796), English botanist
 John Sibthorpe (1669–1718), English politician
 Richard Sibthorp (1792–1879), English Anglican and Roman Catholic priest and member of the Oxford Movement
 Robert Sibthorpe (died 1662), English clergyman

Family tree